Euchresta is a genus of flowering plants in the family Fabaceae. It belongs to the subfamily Faboideae. All species are native to East Asia.

Species
Euchresta comprises the following species:
 Euchresta formosana (Hayata) Ohwi

 Euchresta horsfieldii (Lesch.) Benn.
 Euchresta japonica Regel

 Euchresta tubulosa Dunn
 var. longiracemosa (S.Lee & H.Q.Wen) C.Chen
 var. tubulosa Dunn

Hybrids
The following hybrids have been described:
 ×Euchresta strigillosa C.Y.Wu

References

Sophoreae
Fabaceae genera